John Urquhart Shorter (1844–1904) was a Confederate officer, lawyer, poet and for twelve years first assistant district attorney of Kings County, New York.

Early life 

John U. Shorter was born in Russell County, Alabama, on January 9, 1844. He came from a distinguished Southern lineage. His grandfather was Eli S. Shorter of Columbus, Georgia, where John U. Shorter spent his boyhood and youth. He studied law with his uncle, John Gill Shorter, the Civil War governor of Alabama.

Civil War 
The American Civil War broke out while he was engaged in the study of law and he joined his father in the Confederate Army of Virginia, remaining in service for some months. He then entered the corps of cadets at the University of Alabama. After a year spent here he was detailed as instructor of tactics at the camp of instruction located at Talladega, Alabama. From here he entered active service as adjutant of the 31st Alabama Infantry Regiment in 1862. He was still a teenager when he received his commission, but did well on the field of battle, serving with credit around Vicksburg before the siege of that city.

He was taken prisoner and passed some time in the officer prison on Johnson's Island at Sandusky, Ohio. After the war he taught school for a time at Bainbridge, Georgia, continuing the study of the law he had begun while in the Federal prison. Later he continued his studies In the office of his uncle, Governor Shorter, at Eufala, Alabama, from which place he was admitted to practice.

New York 

In 1870 he came to Brooklyn and for thirty years was a well known figure at the bar of Kings County. He was associated for a time with Howe & Hummel of New York, later on joining fortunes with James W. Ridgway. When the latter was elected district attorney of Kings County in 1883 he appointed his law partner as his first assistant, which post was held by Shorter until 1895, when he retired to private practice. He was made an honorary member of the 139th Regiment Veterans Association a few years before his death, a distinction he alone held as a Southern soldier.

Death 
He died at the Seney Hospital on March 13, 1904 at 5 o'clock in the afternoon after a two days illness. He was sixty years old. Heart disease was assigned as the cause of death. Shorter had not been in the best of health for a month before, but his illness did not take a serious turn until Wednesday of the week before, when his physician advised him to go to a hospital for treatment. He had just returned from a trip to the South for the benefit of his health when matters took a turn for the worse. He seemed to be holding his own while at the hospital and his death came unexpectedly.

Personal life 
He left a wife and one daughter, Laura Dean Shorter, who was an actress and played under the name of Laura de Nio. At the time of her father's death she was a member of the cast in An English Daisy, then playing at Baltimore.

Legacy 
Shorter had achieved a considerable local reputation as a poet, many contributions from his pen having been published in the Eagle. At the time of his death his widow had In her possession the typewritten manuscript of a number of his poems. The following is one of the last published. It Is entitled "Pegasus":

References 

1844 births
1904 deaths
Confederate States Army officers
19th-century American lawyers
19th-century American poets